Folker Township is an inactive township in Clark County, in the U.S. state of Missouri.

Folker Township was established in 1868, taking its name from the local Folker family.

References

Townships in Missouri
Townships in Clark County, Missouri